Wayde Egan (born 20 March 1998) is an Australian professional rugby league footballer who plays as a  for the New Zealand Warriors in the NRL.

He previously played for the Penrith Panthers in the National Rugby League.

Background
Egan was born in Lithgow, New South Wales, Australia, and was educated at Lithgow High School. 

He played his junior rugby league for the Lithgow Storm, before being signed by the Penrith Panthers.

Playing career

Early career
From 2016 to 2017, Egan played for the Penrith Panthers' NYC team, co-captaining the side in 2017. In August 2017, he re-signed with the Panthers on a 2-year contract until the end of 2019. In September 2017, he was named at hooker in the NYC Team of the Year.

2018
In 2018, Egan graduated to the Panthers' Intrust Super Premiership NSW team. In round 4 of the 2018 NRL season, he made his NRL debut for the Panthers against the North Queensland Cowboys.

2019
Egan made a total of 18 appearances for Penrith in the 2019 NRL season as the club finished 10th on the table and missed the finals for the first time since 2015.  Following the conclusion of the season, Egan was told by Penrith that he was free to look elsewhere for the 2020 season as his contract would not be renewed.
On 22 October, Egan signed a contract to join the New Zealand Warriors for the 2020 NRL season.

2020
Egan made a total of 18 appearances for the New Zealand Warriors as the club missed out on the finals.

2021
On 18 July, Egan was ruled out for the remainder of the 2021 NRL season after suffering a shoulder injury in the club's loss against Penrith although he did make an early comeback.

2022
Egan made a total of 20 appearances for the New Zealand Warriors in the 2022 NRL season as they finished 15th on the table.

References

External links

Penrith Panthers profile
Lithgow Storm Juniors

1997 births
Living people
Australian rugby league players
Penrith Panthers players
New Zealand Warriors players
Rugby league hookers
Rugby league players from Lithgow, New South Wales